Rodolfo "Rudy" Lozano (July 10, 1942 – July 11, 2018) was a United States district judge of the United States District Court for the Northern District of Indiana.

Education and career
Born in East Chicago, Indiana, Lozano received a Bachelor of Science degree from Indiana University Bloomington in 1963 and a Bachelor of Laws from Indiana University Maurer School of Law in 1966. He was in the United States Army Reserve from 1966 to 1973. He was in private practice in Merrillville, Indiana from 1966 to 1988.

Federal judicial service
On December 4, 1987, Lozano was nominated by President Ronald Reagan to a seat on the United States District Court for the Northern District of Indiana vacated by Judge Michael Stephen Kanne. Lozano was confirmed by the United States Senate on February 25, 1988, and received his commission on February 26, 1988. He assumed senior status on July 10, 2007, serving in that status until his death on July 11, 2018.

See also
List of Hispanic/Latino American jurists

References

Sources

1942 births
2018 deaths
Hispanic and Latino American judges
Indiana University Bloomington alumni
Judges of the United States District Court for the Northern District of Indiana
People from East Chicago, Indiana
People from Merrillville, Indiana
Military personnel from Indiana
United States district court judges appointed by Ronald Reagan
20th-century American judges
United States Army personnel
United States Army reservists